The Bangkok Mass Transit System, commonly known as the BTS Skytrain (  [BTS]), is an elevated rapid transit system in Bangkok, Thailand. It is operated by Bangkok Mass Transit System PCL (BTSC), a subsidiary of BTS Group Holdings, under a concession granted by the Bangkok Metropolitan Administration (BMA) which owns the lines. The BTS Sukhumvit Line running northwards and south-eastwards, terminating at Khu Khot and Kheha respectively. The BTS Silom Line which serves Silom and Sathon Roads, the central business district of Bangkok, terminates at National Stadium and Bang Wa. The Gold Line people mover runs from Krung Thon Buri to Klong San and serves Iconsiam. The lines interchange at Siam station and Krung Thon Buri. The system is formally known as "The Elevated Train in Commemoration of HM the King's 6th Cycle Birthday".

Besides the three BTS lines, Bangkok's rapid transit system includes the underground and elevated Mass Rapid Transit (MRT) lines, the Bus Rapid Transit System (BRT), and the elevated Airport Rail Link (ARL), serving several stations before reaching Suvarnabhumi Airport, and the SRT Red Lines of the State Railway of Thailand.

History

Plans for mass transit in Bangkok began in the early-1980s. An early version of the Skytrain project was known as the Lavalin Skytrain because it was designed using the Vancouver SkyTrain as a model, adopting technology developed by SNC-Lavalin. Due to political interference, the concession with Lavalin was cancelled in June 1992, despite Bangkok's chronic traffic congestion. The Thai Government focused on increasing road and expressway infrastructure in an attempt to reduce the congestion. This had little impact as the number of cars on the road continued to increase dramatically. The routes considered as part of the Skytrain project would become the basis for the MRT system and are mainly underground. In the early-1990s, foundations and a viaduct for the Lavalin Skytrain were constructed in the middle of the Phra Pok Klao Bridge across the Chao Phraya River. The planned metro bridge remains unused but may become part of the MRT's future Purple Line.

Another abortive attempt at building an elevated rail network was the Bangkok Elevated Road and Train System (BERTS), which was terminated in 1998 after only 13.77 percent had been completed.

Shortly after it became clear that the Lavalin Skytrain had stalled, then-Governor Major General Chamlong Srimuang asked his deputy, Captain Kritsada Arunwong na Ayutthaya, to create a new feeder system with a route along Sukhumvit and Silom Roads. Krisda and his team from the Bangkok Metropolitan Administration (BMA) succeeded in finding a private investor. Krisda also convinced everyone concerned to allow the city supervise the project. Keeree Kanjanapas founded the Bangkok Transit System Corporation (BTSC) and it successfully financed the system and grew it from a feeder system to a full mass transit project. Thanayong Public Company Limited ) had a 28 percent stake in BTSC when the Skytrain began, and therefore in its early days the system was sometimes referred to as the "Thanayong Skytrain".

Siemens, the supplier of the railway technology, and the Thai contractor, Italian Thai Development, built the system for BTSC. The "Skytrain" name was bestowed later by the press following the Vancouver example where the elevated metro had been named "Skytrain". Originally, the Skytrain depot was to be built underneath Lumphini Park, but due to widespread objections from Bangkok residents it was constructed on a parcel of land on Phahonyothin Road, replacing the old northern/northeastern bus terminal (Mo Chit). The current depot at Mo Chit is part of the proposed "Bangkok Terminal" project, where a large complex composed of a new regional bus terminal, park and ride facility, and other commercial development can be built directly above it.

The Skytrain system was opened on 5 December 1999 by Princess Maha Chakri Sirindhorn. It initially had lower-than-predicted ridership, with 200,000 passenger trips per day. Ticket revenue was only enough to meet the trains' operating cost, and not sufficient to service construction loans.  The Skytrain's daily passenger numbers have steadily increased since then. On 9 December 2005, more than 500,000 single trips were made on the Skytrain on a single day for the first time. By September 2012, the Skytrain served around 600,000 passengers on an average day, increasing to 650,000 on an average weekday in 2013. A record 760,000 passengers traveled on Sunday, 22 December 2013, a day of mass political protest in Bangkok. The normal Sunday average is 400,000 passengers. The BTS had a fleet of 52 four-car trains (208 carriages) by 2017. 46 new four-car trains (184 carriages) were ordered to address growing capacity requirements of the existing lines to cater for the Sukhumvit Line extensions south to Kheha and north to Khu Khot. They were delivered from 2018 to 2020.

On March 5, 2020, the BTS made a song about the COVID-19 pandemic, as an antidote to the grim warnings about the coronavirus, showing the staff dancing and keeping hygiene.

Station layout

All of the system's stations are elevated and constructed on three levels. The street level provides access to the station proper via stairs and often escalators and lifts. Supporting utility equipment (generators, water tanks) are usually located at this level on traffic islands.

The first elevated level of the stations contains the ticket booths, some small kiosk-like shops, and fare gates. The second level (and third at Siam station) is again accessed with stairs, lifts and escalators and contains the platforms and rails. With the exception of Siam Station, Ha Yaek Lat Phrao station and Samrong, the stations follow a side platform layout. Siam Station uses island platforms to facilitate cross-platform interchange between the two lines. The distances between doors are equal throughout the train, regardless of whether they are in the same or different cars, and the locations where the doors will be after the train has stopped are marked on the platform. The platforms are built to accommodate trains of six cars, but trains of only four cars are in operation. Security personnel are stationed at every platform and ticketing hall.

Five Skytrain stations, Sala Daeng, Asok, Ha Yaek Lat Phrao, Bang Wa and Mo Chit, are interchanges with the MRT system. Saphan Taksin station is connected to the adjacent Sathon Pier where the Chao Phraya Express Boat services call. Many stations are linked by skybridges (overhead pedestrian walkways) to neighbouring buildings and public amenities.

Platform screen doors (half size) are installed at On Nut, Phrom Phong, Asok, Chit Lom, Siam, Thong Lor, Phaya Thai, Victory Monument, Sala Daeng, and Chong Nonsi stations from 2014 to present . These will eventually be installed at all stations. The installation at Phrom Phrong station caused a software problem and a six-hour shutdown of all BTS services on 24 December 2013, leading to gridlock in the city.

Ticketing

Fares are calculated according to distance. From 2007 a stored-value card called the BTS Smartpass was sold. In May 2012, this was replaced by a new stored-value ticket called Rabbit Card. Rabbit Card is an electronic payment card system that allows holders to pay for the fee of BTS and BRT with only one card. Rabbit Cards can also be used to pay for other services and restaurants that are associated with BTS.

Single tickets can be purchased at ticket machines. The ticket is tapped on the way in, but inserted to be swallowed when leaving the paid area.

The Mangmoom Card which is intended to be used on the Skytrain, MRT and Airport Rail Link was repeatedly delayed from its original 2015 launch date and is not currently valid on the BTS.

At present, two of Bangkok train systems (Skytrain, and Airport Rail Link) require separate tickets to be purchased to travel around the network. Only MRT and SRT Red Line accept EMV (Europay, Mastercard, and Visa) contactless that you can tap your credit/debit card directly to entrance gate.

BTS Network

At its opening, the BTS had 23 stations on its two lines: 17 on the BTS Sukhumvit Line and 7 on the Silom Line, with both lines interchanging at Siam. Since then, 30 additional stations have opened on the Sukhumvit Line and 6 on the Silom Line, with the latest new 3 stations at Gold Line.

BTS Route extensions
In 2002, the cabinet of then Prime Minister Thaksin Shinawatra amended laws in order to allow private firms to finance the cost of operating the train system, while the government would undertake civil engineering works to build new extensions.

Timeline of BTS openings
 5 December 1999 Sukhumvit Line: Mo Chit – On Nut; Silom Line: National Stadium – Saphan Taksin
 15 May 2009 Silom Line: Saphan Taksin (S06) – Wong Wian Yai (S08)
 12 August 2011 Sukhumvit Line: On Nut (E09) – Bearing (E14)
 12 January 2013 Silom Line: Wong Wian Yai (S08) – Pho Nimit (S09) 
 14 February 2013 Silom Line: Pho Nimit (S09) – Talat Phlu (S10)
 5 December 2013 Silom Line: Talat Phlu (S10) – Bang Wa (S12)
 3 April 2017 Sukhumvit Line: Bearing (E14) – Samrong (E15)
 6 December 2018 Sukhumvit Line: Samrong (E15) – Kheha Samut Prakan (E23)
 9 August 2019 Sukhumvit Line: Mo Chit (N8) – Ha Yaek Lat Phrao (N9)
 4 December 2019 Sukhumvit Line: Ha Yaek Lat Phrao (N9) – Kasetsart University (N13)
 5 June 2020 Sukhumvit Line: Kasetsart University (N13) – Wat Phra Sri Mahathat (N17)
 16 December 2020 Sukhumvit Line: Wat Phra Sri Mahathat (N17) – Khu Khot (N24)
 8 February 2021 Silom Line: Saint Louis (S4, infill station)

1st extension – Silom Line south to Wong Wian Yai (2009)
On 18 October 2005, with no approval from the central government forthcoming, Bangkok Metropolitan Administration (BMA) decided to fund and complete the  Silom Line route extension to Krung Thonburi Station (S07) and Wongwian Yai Station (S08). Construction began on 13 December 2005 with completion originally expected within two years. However, problems with the tendering and installation of a new Bombardier open signalling system repeatedly pushed back the schedule. The extension finally opening on 15 May 2009. However, the single platform Saphan Taksin station which has only one track, has caused repeated delays during rush hour. In 2012, the BMA announced plans to demolish Saphan Taksin station in the future. There are now plans to construct new platforms and remove the bottleneck and keep the station which provides an important link between river boats. The plan includes redesigning the road bridges either side of the viaduct to fit the new station.

2nd extension – Sukhumvit Line east to Bearing (2011)
A second extension, the 5.25 km On Nut station (E09) to Bearing station (E14) started construction in August 2006. The 4 billion baht extension was again funded by the BMA. The original scheduled opening date was mid-2009. However, an unusual, prolonged delay in the tendering of the contract for the electrical and signals resulted in a two-year delay. "The senior City Hall official responsible for making the purchase has apparently stalled the scheme over fears of being investigated if something went wrong with the purchase."

The BTSC was contracted by the BMA to run the extension. Subsequently, the extension did not open until over two years later on 12 August 2011. The delay in opening prompted the BMA to offer free travel for this extension until the end of 2011 as compensation. A flat fare separate from the distance based fare normal in the BTS network was then charged for this section. However, distance based fares are now used for this extension.

3rd extension – Silom Line south to Bang Wa (2013)
The third extension to the network, a 5.3 km, four station extension from Wongwian Yai (S8) to Bang Wa (S12) in Phasi Charoen District began construction in the 2nd quarter of 2011 with a deadline of the end of 2012. Only the stations had to be constructed as the viaduct had been completed some years prior. However, construction was delayed for many months by the Bangkok floods of late 2011. It eventually opened in stages. Pho Nimit opened on 12 January 2013, Talat Phlu opened on 14 February 2013, with the last two stations opening on 5 December 2013. For most of 2013, passengers changed platforms and trains at Wongwian Yai for a shuttle service to S09 and S10 as there was no turnout at S10 for through trains. Since the opening of the final section of the extension to Bang Wa station on 5 December 2013, this is no longer the case.

4th extension – Sukhumvit Line east to Kheha (2017-2018)
The extension is being built by Ch. Karnchang. Two stations (E18 & E22) will be built at a later date. The extension was funded by the MRTA as it is outside BMA city limits. The extension was planned to open in 2017. In April 2013, the MRTA awarded Ch Karnchang the contract for track laying and electrical systems. Construction was completed in 2017, but arguments over who should operate the line delayed the opening. One station, Samrong opened earlier, on 3 April 2017. The full extension opened on 6 December 2018 and the BTSC has announced that the free travel concession on this section will continue until the new train sets arrive to allow for the new section to be fully functional.

5th extension – Sukhumvit Line north to Khu Khot (2019-2020)
1) Mo Chit station to Saphan Mai: 11.4 km, 12 stations (N9–N20).
2) Saphan Mai to Khu Khot: 7.5 km, four stations (N21-N24).
An 11.4 km, 12 station northern extension from Mo Chit station to Saphan Mai in Don Mueang District has been planned since the Sukhumvit Line opened. Originally, this extension was scheduled to be completed by 2008. However, due to a combination of changes in government, a prolonged environmental study, and problems with locating a suitable train depot, the extension has been continually delayed.

A further 16.5 km, nine station extension from Saphan Mai to Lam Lukka was also planned once the extension to Saphan Mai had been completed. This was subsequently split into two extensions. A 7.5 km, four station extension to Khu Khot and a 9 km, five station extension along Lam Lukka Road to Lam Lukka.

Due to the significant delay in the northern extension plans, in mid-2013 it was decided by the MRTA to tender extensions (1) & (2) at the same time by the end of 2013.  However, the dissolution of parliament in November 2013 delayed this yet again. A tender was finally released in January 2014 with an April deadline before being delayed until late May 2014 due to concerns from bidders.

A military coup in late-May suspended the bidding process while the military administration reviewed all major projects. In late-June, the military administration affirmed the tender which will proceed before the end of 2014. In mid-August, the MRTA announced that the new tender deadline would be 30 September 2014. Five bidders qualified with successful bids to be announced by December. The contract to construct the line for both extensions (1) & (2) was finally signed in April 2015 and the full extension is scheduled to open in 2020.

Testing of the final 9.8 km, 7 station section from Wat Phra Sri Mahathat (N17) to Khu Khot (N24) began on 5 October and continued until the full extension opens. It was officially inaugurated on 16 December 2020 by the Prime Minister.

Opening dates
 The first section to Ha Yaek Lat Phrao station (N9) opened on 9 August 2019;
 the next 4 stations from Ha Yaek Lat Phrao station (N9) to Kasetsart University (N13) opened on 4 December 2019;
 further 4 stations from Kasetsart University (N13) to Wat Phra Sri Mahathat (N17) opened on 5 June 2020;
 the remaining section of 9.8 km and 7 stations from Wat Phra Sri Mahathat (N17) to Khu Khot (N24) opened on 16 December 2020.

Saint Louis (S4) infill station – Silom Line (2021)
In 2018, it was decided to finally build the missing Saint Louis (S4) station (originally named Sueksa Wittaya), the EIA was finalised in March 2019. Construction of the station began in August 2019 and by the end of 2019 had reached 25% progress. By August 2020, construction had reached 50% but was 30% behind schedule due to COVID related delays.

The station opened on 8 February 2021.

Future extension plans
BTS Group Holdings will tender to operate more BTS and MRT lines in the future through financing from its BTS Rail Mass Transit Growth Infrastructure Fund after it received approval from the Thai Securities and Exchange Commission in March 2013. The IPO raised US$2.1 billion, the largest in Thailand's history.

Sukhumvit Line, north
A further 9 km, five station extension from Khu Khot station to Wongwaen-Lam Luk Ka station is planned to be constructed by 2029.

Sukhumvit Line, east
 A further 7 km, five-station extension from Kheha station to Bang Pu station is planned to be constructed by 2029.
 A spur line from Bang Na to Suvarnabhumi Airport (terminating at future South Passenger Terminal of Suvarnabhumi Airport). However, this may also be built as a light rail or monorail line.

Silom Line, south
After the opening of Wutthakat (S11) and Bang Wa (S12) stations 5 December 2013, the BMA announced a new proposal to further extended the Silom line by 7 km from Bang Wa (S12) station, by six stations to Taling Chan. At Taling Chan it would connect with the SRT Light Red line.

A public hearing was held in 2015. Three route options were considered, with construction intended to start in 2017. Part of the basis for this further extension by the BMA is that it would provide proximate access to the Southern Bus Terminal. The BMA Transport and Traffic Office completed an economic evaluation of the extension in October 2018 which found a cost benefit ratio of 2.37. The study recommended that an EIA be completed in 2019 but this was delayed.

Silom Line, west
The Silom Line is planned to be extended by one or two stations west along Rama 1 from National Stadium (W1) to link with the SRT Dark Red Line at Yot Se station. However, no time frame for this extension has been announced and this section of the SRT Dark Red Line will not be built until after 2022.

Originally, the plan was to extend the Silom Line west from National Stadium into Chinatown, then north to Democracy Monument where it would then run west to Rattanakosin Island and Sanum Luang, tunnel under the river to the Thonburi side before terminating at Phran Nok. However, this plan was shelved in 2009 and much of this route has been replaced by routing changes to the planned MRT Orange Line.

Terminal Station 

Terminal stations and physical ends of their lines are Khu Khot, Kheha, National Stadium, Bang wa.

Some trains terminate early and resume travel in the opposite direction at Wat Phra Sri Mahathat, Ha Yaek Lat Phrao, Mo Chit (rare), Samrong, Krung Thon Buri BTS (Helper Train). This allows more frequent trains on the central sections of the lines without added investment in carriages.

Rolling stock
The BTS Skytrain uses two variations of electric multiple unit rolling stock. All trains have four doors on each side per car, an air-conditioning unit, and LCD monitors for public announcement and advertising. Public announcements are spoken by actress Ratklao Amaradit. The power supply for all trains is at 750 V DC from the third rail.

Siemens trains

First order (EMU-A1)

The rolling stock of BTS Skytrain, in use when the line opened in 1999, consisted of 35 Siemens Modular Metro trains from Siemens. These initial trains had three cars, two motor cars and one trailer in the center. The Sukhumvit Line used 20 trains, and the Silom Line had 15.

After the 12 new car CNR trains were delivered for the Silom line in December 2010, the 15 Siemens trains on the Silom Line were transferred to the Sukhumvit Line.

Second order: extra cars to expand to four-car train operations (EMU-A1)
To increase capacity, in October 2010, BTSC ordered an extra 35 single cars from Siemens to make each train a four car set.

These extra cars were progressively introduced into operation from November 2012 to March 2013, when all 35 sets of Siemens rolling stock finally became four car sets.

The Silom Line cars have been modified to support a signaling system from Bombardier Transportation since the extension from Saphan Taksin to Wong Wian Yai.

Third order: new four-car sets for extension operations (EMU-A2)

To serve the Sukhumvit Line Extension (East) BTSC ordered 22 new Siemens-Bozankaya EMU four-car trains from a consortium of Siemens and Bozankaya in May 2016.

These trains were manufactured in the Bozankaya factory in Ankara, Turkey. Siemens supplied bogies, traction, braking and auxiliary systems and was responsible for project management, development, construction and commissioning of the trains. Siemens will also take on service and maintenance for 16 years.

The first set of the new batch of rolling stock arrived in early August 2018 for testing and approval by the BTSC. These new trains increase capacity from 1,490 passengers per train to 1,573. As of the opening of the new Sukhumvit Line extension to Kheha Samut Prakan on 6 December 2018, only 3 sets of the 22 sets had been delivered. This resulted in a limited 10-minute frequency, shuttle service for the new extension as an interim measure until more rolling stock is delivered.

The train features : Perch Seats, LCD Dynamic Route Map (AKA. Passengers Information Display)

CNR Changchun trains

First order (EMU-B1)

In early 2008, the BTSC ordered 12 new trains (12 sets of four cars) from Changchun Railway Vehicles (EMU B class) to cater for the then soon to open Wong Wian Yai extension of the Silom Line. Their design was modified to the existing BTS's Siemens Modular Metro. The new trains were delivered late and only began service the Silom Line in December 2010. This was some 18 months after the Wong Wian Yai and Krung Thonburi stations were opened in May 2009 during which time there was severe overcrowding on the Silom line.

These trains consist of two-motor cars and two-trailer cars (i.e., four-car trainsets) and feature LCD TVs for public announcements and advertising. An advanced digital voice announcement (DVA) and passenger information systems was installed.

Second order (EMU-B2)
In September 2011, the BTSC ordered five more four-car trainsets of CNR rolling stock for 1.5 billion baht to prepare for the Silom Line extension to Bang Wa which was then due to open in December 2012. These five new train sets of rolling stock entered service on 29 November 2013 after the first two stations of the Silom Line extension to Bang Wa opened in January and February 2013, respectively. This second batch of CNR EMUs (B Class) differ slightly from the first batch in exterior fitting out such as with the LCDs screens, LED route displays, signage, and passenger communication units.

CRRC Changchun trains (EMU-B3)

In May 2016, BTSC has signed a contract to order 24 more four-car trains of CRRC Changchun Railway Vehicles rolling stock to prepare for the Sukhumvit Line extension (North) and to cater for increasing demand, with expected delivery in 2018.

It has delivered 24 of its cars to Mo Chit Depot. 24 cars are now operating its service on the Silom Line and Sukhumvit Line (Car 75–98)

This train features : Perch Seats, LCD Dynamic Route Map (AKA. Passengers Information Display)

Ridership
The first years of operations saw limited ridership. The line had few direct ramps into malls and lacked escalators. Little by little, while escalators were installed and side bridges added, patronage increased. The opening of Siam Paragon Mall in 2004, at the time Thailand's most luxurious mall, boosted crowds at the system's central Siam station. The redevelopment of the Ratchaprasong and Siam districts as well as new "skywalks" fostered growing accessibility.

Ridership grew steadily with incremental expansion of the lines, and at peak hour, the trains sometimes depart without being able to take all waiting passengers. Average daily ridership first surpassed 200,000 in June 2001, 300,000 in November 2003, 400,000 in March 2006, 500,000 in August 2011, 600,000 in August 2013 and 700,000 in November 2017.

Ridership statistics

Network Map

See also
 Sukhumvit Line
 Silom Line
Keeree Kanjanapas
Rail transport in Bangkok
List of rapid transit stations in Bangkok
 Mass Rapid Transit Master Plan in Bangkok Metropolitan Region
 MRT (Bangkok)
 MRT Blue Line
 MRT Brown Line
 MRT Grey Line
 MRT Light Blue Line
 MRT Orange Line
 MRT Pink Line
 MRT Yellow Line
Airport Rail Link (Bangkok)
 SRT Dark Red Line
 SRT Light Red Line
 BMA Gold Line
 Bangkok BRT

References

External links

 BTS, ARL, MRT & BRT network map
 Bangkok at UrbanRail.net
 Photo visual guide  by travellikeaboss.org
COVID-19 song

 
1999 establishments in Thailand
750 V DC railway electrification